The Bingham Military School was the state of North Carolina's first military school, founded in 1826 by Capt. D.H. Bingham, with the intention of providing more accessible training for military officers.  The school opened its doors in January 1827, with D.H. Bingham as its superintendent and Capt. Patridge, who had served in the French army, as its head instructor.  The school relocated twice, first from Williamsborough to Littleton in 1829, and then later that year from Littleton to Oxford.

The school initially opened to some popularity.  However, it soon came under fire by the newspaper The Star due to its young educators and the frequent absence of Capt. Patridge, who was more qualified.  The school moved again to Raleigh in 1831, shortly before Bingham left the school for a position with a railroad company in Alabama in 1833.  Finally, in 1836, the school moved to Wilmington.  The school shut down fairly soon thereafter.

It is sometimes mistaken for the Bingham School, or the Hillsborough Academy. It should not to be confused with another school operating under the name established in Mebane, North Carolina, in 1865.  The Bingham School of Mebane split in 1891 after a disagreement between the brothers who owned the school, with the Robert Bingham School relocating to Asheville and the Mebane-based branch becoming known as the William Bingham School.

Notable alumni
 Nelson Phillips (1873–1939), judge on the Supreme Court of Texas
 Perry G. Wall II (1867–1944), businessman and mayor of Tampa, Florida
 George Francis Willis (1880–1932), millionaire who made his fortune in patent medicines

References

Military schools in the United States
1826 establishments in North Carolina
Defunct schools in North Carolina